Ranjit Studios, also known as Ranjit Movietone, was an Indian film production company with studio facilities located in Mumbai, Maharashtra, India. It produced films between 1929 and mid-1970s. The studio was founded by Chandulal Shah along with Gohar Kayoum Mamajiwala. It was one of the three largest studios in Bollywood of its time, besides Kohinoor Film Company and Imperial Film Company.

The company began production of silent films in 1929 under the banner Ranjit Film Company and by 1932 had made 39 pictures, most of them social dramas. The company changed its name to Ranjit Movietone in 1932 and during the 1930s produced numerous successful talkies at the rate of about six a year. At this time, the studio employed around 300 actors, technicians and other employees.

Ranjit productions were mostly filmed in the Hindi, Punjabi and Gujarati languages.

The company ended at some time in the late 1960s.

References

External links
 Chandulal Shah biography
 Ranjit Films on the IMDb
 Ranjit Studios on the IMDb

Hindi cinema
Film studios in Mumbai
1929 establishments in India
Mass media companies established in 1929
Companies disestablished in the 1960s
1960s disestablishments in India